Stanisław Fiszer (1769–1812) was Polish General and Chief of Staff of the Duchy of Warsaw.

He was married to Wirydianna Fiszerowa, remembered for her memoirs.

An inhabitant of Poland, his family was originally from Germany. Between 1783 and 1788 he attended the Corps of Cadets and joined Tadeusz Kosciuszko's brigade which was part of Poland's Division. Under Kosciuszko's command he fought in the Polish-Russian war of 1792. He took part in the battle of Polonno and the battle of Dubienka and moved up the ranks, eventually becoming a lieutenant. He was given the highest military decoration for heroism and courage in Poland - the Virtuti Militari. At the end of 1792 he arrived in Gdańsk, where according to Szymon Askenazy he was checking the state of the city's fortifications which were to be used as a part of project in which the Polish army that had been defeated by Russians was to move from Prussia to Gdańsk where they were to wait for help from France. In January 1793 after Prussia invaded Greater Poland, Fiszer, disguised as an emergency doctor, reached Frankfurt on the Oder where he surveyed the Prussian army moving towards Poland.

References

This article was translated from Stanisław Fiszer (generał)

1769 births
1812 deaths
Polish generals
Polish commanders of the Napoleonic Wars
Generals of the Polish Legions (Napoleonic period)
Polish people of German descent